Topological excitations are certain features of classical solutions of gauge field theories.

Namely, a gauge field theory on a manifold  with a gauge group  may possess classical solutions with a (quantized) topological invariant called topological charge. The term topological excitation especially refers to a situation when the topological charge is an integral of a localized quantity.

Examples:

The concept of a topological excitation is almost synonymous with that of a topological defect.

References

Theoretical physics